Coast Guard Beach may refer to either of two beaches in the Cape Cod National Seashore in Massachusetts.

Coast Guard Beach (Eastham, Massachusetts)
Coast Guard Beach (Truro, Massachusetts)